Barron Gift Collier (March 23, 1873 – March 13, 1939) was an American advertising entrepreneur who became the largest landowner and developer in the U.S. state of Florida, as well as the owner of a chain of hotels, bus lines, several banks, and newspapers, and of a telephone company and a steamship line.

Collier was born in Memphis, Tennessee. He quit school at age 16 to work for the Illinois Central Railroad. Within four years, he started his own business, the Consolidated Street Railway Advertising Company of New York City. At age 26, his assets were valued at a million dollars.

Background
In 1907, Barron Collier married Juliet Gordon Carnes, also a native of Memphis. In 1911, they visited Fort Myers, Florida on vacation and developed an enduring relationship with the area. They bought nearby Useppa Island for the sum of $100,000. 

Collier was an avid fisherman and established the Izaak Walton Club at their Useppa Island resort;  it became one of the most exclusive sporting clubs in the world. Collier next developed golf courses and improved the Rod and Gun Club, a hunting club in Everglades City, Florida, that also attracted wealthy tourists. Over the next decade, the Colliers went on to acquire more than a million acres (4000 km2) of land in Southwest Florida, making them the largest private land owners in the state. He invested millions of dollars to transform and develop the wilderness, including drainage of the Everglades and construction of the Tamiami Trail. To recognize his influence on, and investment in, the state's future, the Florida legislature named the newly created Collier County for him on May 8, 1923.

He manifested tremendous energy in other pursuits. He was involved in the national Boy Scout movement. In New York, serving as special deputy commissioner for public safety, he introduced the use of white and yellow traffic divider lines on highways. Following the Lindbergh kidnapping in March 1932, he was influential in persuading the U.S. government to join, in 1938, INTERPOL, which had been formed in 1923. He was decorated by nine foreign governments.

His wife, Juliet Carnes Collier, appeared on the cover of the U.S. edition of the Tatler, the Tatler and American Sketch, in the early 1930s.

Collier died March 13, 1939, in Manhattan, survived by his wife and three sons, Barron Jr., Miles, and Samuel, and was interred at Woodlawn Cemetery in the Bronx, New York. Although the Great Depression had strained his finances and slowed development of their Florida lands, the next generations of his family would continue his development work in subsequent decades.

The family members participated in many sports, including motorsports, and especially road racing, which led to the sons Miles and Sam founding the Automobile Racing Club of America in 1933, renamed in 1944 as the Sports Car Club of America (SCCA). Miles, Cameron Argetsinger, and Briggs Cunningham were instrumental in founding the Watkins Glen racing facility, near one of their summer retreats. Juliet worried about the risks of racing and tried to influence her sons against it; Sam would indeed die in a racing accident at Watkins Glen in 1950. Briggs's renowned automobile collection was purchased by a member of the Collier family, and is now part of the Revs Institute for Automotive Research in Naples, Florida, which is open to the public.

The Collier County Public School System named Barron Collier High School in honor of Barron Gift Collier, Sr.

References

 Gene M. Burnett, Florida's Past, Volume 3, Pineapple Press, Sarasota, Florida, 1991

External links

American businesspeople
American motorsport people
Auto racing executives
Collier County, Florida
People from Memphis, Tennessee
Burials at Woodlawn Cemetery (Bronx, New York)
1873 births
1939 deaths